Carbon Design System is a free and open-source design system and library created by IBM, which implements the IBM Design Language, and licensed under Apache License 2.0. Its public development initially started on June 10, 2015. Their components have multiple implementations, which includes a vanilla JS and CSS implementation and React (maintained by the Carbon Core team), while the community maintains the frameworks developed in Svelte, Vue.js, and Web Components. The official typeface to be used according to the guidelines is the IBM Plex typeface, with alternative typefaces for CJK scripts are Noto Sans CJK SC, Noto Sans CJK TC, and Noto Sans JP.

See also 
 Design language
 Flat design
 Fluent Design System by Microsoft
 Material Design by Google

References

External links 
 

Design language
Graphical user interfaces
IBM